The Walter Gemma was a Czechoslovakian nine-cylinder, air-cooled, radial aero engine that was developed and manufactured in the early 1930s by Walter Aircraft Engines.

Applications
Nuri Demirağ Nu D.36
Praga E-39

Engines on display
A preserved example of the Walter Gemma engine is on display at the following museum:
Finnish Aviation Museum

Specifications

See also

References

Notes

Bibliography

 Gunston, Bill. World Encyclopedia of Aero Engines. Cambridge, England. Patrick Stephens Limited, 1989. 

Gemma
1930s aircraft piston engines
Aircraft air-cooled radial piston engines